Al-Farwat is a sub-district located in Sanhan and Bani Bahlul District, Sana'a Governorate, Yemen. Al-Farwat had a population of 8540 according to the 2004 census.

References 

Sub-districts in Sanhan and Bani Bahlul District